Robinson Township is one of ten townships in Crawford County, Illinois, USA.  As of the 2010 census, its population was 9,900 and it contained 4,183 housing units.

Geography

Cities, towns, villages
 Robinson (the county seat)

Cemeteries
The township contains these six cemeteries: Duncanville, Kirk, Minnick, New Robinson, Newlin and Old Robinson.

Major highways
  Illinois Route 1
  Illinois Route 33

Airports and landing strips
 Crawford Memorial Hospital Heliport

Lakes
 Brooks Lake
 West Lake

Landmarks
 City Park
 Washington Park

Demographics

School districts
 Robinson Community Unit School District 2

Political districts
 Illinois' 15th congressional district
 State House District 109
 State Senate District 55

References
 
 United States Census Bureau 2007 TIGER/Line Shapefiles
 United States National Atlas

External links
 City-Data.com
 Illinois State Archives

Townships in Crawford County, Illinois
Townships in Illinois